The 2021 Liga 3 Special Region of Yogyakarta (also known as Liga 3 MS Glow For Men PSSI Yogyakarta for sponsorship reason) will be the fourth season of Liga 3 Special Region of Yogyakarta as a qualifying round for the national round of the 2021–22 Liga 3.

Sleman United were the defending champion.

Teams
There are 15 teams participated in the league this season.

First round

Group A
All matches were held at the Dwi Windu Stadium, Bantul Regency.

Group B
All matches were held at the Kridosono Stadium, Yogyakarta.

Group C
All matches were held at the Tridadi Stadium, Sleman Regency.

Second round

Group X
All matches were held at the Kridosono Stadium, Yogyakarta.

Group Y
All matches were held at the Dwi Windu Stadium, Bantul Regency.

Knockout stage

Semifinals

Finals

References

Liga 3